St Jidgey is a hamlet in mid Cornwall, England, United Kingdom. It lies along the A39 road, north of St Columb Major and southwest of Wadebridge. It contains the Halfway House Inn, a coaching inn. The name is recorded as Sentysy in 1517; it is derived from St Ydi (in English St Issey).

References

Hamlets in Cornwall